"Over the Edge" is the first single from American bluegrass artist Sarah Jarosz off of her third studio album, Build Me Up from Bones (2013). Written by Sarah Jarosz and Jedd Hughes, the song has received positive critical acclaim, helping Build Me Up from Bones reach number one on the Americana airplay charts in October 2013.

Personnel
Sarah Jarosz – vocal, octave mandolin
Jedd Hughes – harmony vocal, guitar
Dan Dugmore – lap steel
Viktor Krauss – bass
Eric Darken – percussion

2013 singles
2013 songs
Bluegrass songs
Songs written by Jedd Hughes